Staush Gruszynski (born February 13, 1985) is an American politician who formerly served in the Wisconsin State Assembly, representing the 90th Assembly District.  He is a member of the Democratic Party.

Electoral history 
Gruszynski has served on the Brown County Board of Supervisors since 2014, and won an unopposed election in 2018 to take over the seat of State Representative Eric Genrich, who was seeking to run for mayor of Green Bay.

On August 11, 2020, Gruszynski lost a partisan primary for his seat to Green Bay Area Public School District board member Kristina Shelton.

Personal life 
Born in Marinette, Wisconsin, Gruszynski is the nephew of Stan Gruszynski, a former Wisconsin State Representative from the Plover area. According to his campaign website, Gruszynski spent summers working for his father's construction business and volunteering for his uncle's campaigns, which he notes sparked his early interest in politics.

Gruszynski is involved in conservation efforts, serving as the president of Green Bay's chapter of conservation group Trout Unlimited, as well as the political director for the Wisconsin League of Conservation Voters.

Gruszynski attended the University of Wisconsin–Oshkosh, and received a degree in political science and public administration in 2008.

In December 2019, the Wisconsin Legislative Human Resources Office substantiated a complaint that Gruszynski sexually harassed a legislative staffer at a bar. Democratic party leaders called on Gruszynski to resign, stripped him of his committee assignments, and prohibited him from caucusing with Democrats. Gruszynksi acknowledged that, on the night of the incident, he "was black out drunk [and] made inappropriate comments" but also "apologized [to the staffer] and was remorseful."

References

External links
 
 

Living people
People from Marinette, Wisconsin
University of Wisconsin–Oshkosh alumni
Democratic Party members of the Wisconsin State Assembly
County supervisors in Wisconsin
1985 births